The regiments of Bengal Native Infantry, alongside the regiments of Bengal European Infantry,  were the regular infantry components of the East India Company's Bengal Army from the raising of the first Native battalion in 1757 to the passing into law of the Government of India Act 1858 (as a direct result of the Indian Mutiny). At this latter point control of the East India Company's Bengal Presidency passed to the British Government. The first locally recruited battalion was raised by the East India Company in 1757 and by the start of 1857 there were 74 regiments of Bengal Native Infantry in the Bengal Army. Following the Mutiny the Presidency armies came under the direct control of the United Kingdom Government and there was a widespread reorganisation of the Bengal Army that saw the Bengal Native Infantry regiments reduced to 45.

The title "Bengal Native Infantry" fell out of use in 1885 and the Bengal Infantry regiments ceased to exist when the three separate Presidency armies were absorbed into the British Indian Army in 1903. There are units currently serving in the armies of India, Pakistan and the United Kingdom who can trace their lineage directly to units of the Bengal Native Infantry, for example the Jat Regiment in the Indian Army, the Royal Gurkha Rifles in the British Army and 6th Battalion, The Punjab Regiment in the Army of Pakistan.

Numbering of regiments, unit designations and nomenclature

The first locally recruited unit of the East India Company's forces in Bengal, raised in 1757 and present at the Battle of Plassey, was known as the Galliez Battalion (named after one of its first Captains) and called the Lal Pultan (Red Battalion) by its locally recruited members.
The Bengal Native Infantry regiments underwent frequent changes of numbering during their existence, with the numbers assigned following a reorganisation bearing little or no connection to the regiments that held the pre-existing numbers. The traditional formation of British and Presidency armies' regiments was by a hierarchy in which the "1st Regiment" was the oldest and the highest number was given to the youngest. In 1764 however, the Bengal Native Infantry regiments were renumbered in the order of the individual seniority of their commanding officers. The regiments were reorganised and renumbered (or renamed) twice in 1861, in 1864, again in 1885 and finally in 1903 the Bengal Army was absorbed into the British Indian Army and the Bengal Infantry ceased to exist.

The inclusion of the word "Native" in the titles of the Bengal Native Infantry regiments and throughout the Bengal, Bombay and Madras Armies indicated that the troops were locally recruited in India (or neighbouring areas), in contrast with the Bengal European Infantry which recruited personnel in the United Kingdom. In 1885, the word "Native" was dropped from the titles of all military units in the Bengal Army.

Recruitment and demographics

The 1st Brahmans was the first infantry regiment of the British Indian Army. It was raised at Oudh by Captain T Naylor in 1776

The Bengal army mostly recruited upper-caste elements, Brahmans, Rajputs, and Bhumihars from Bengal, Awadh and Bihar.

Bengal Native Infantry regiments typically consisted of 800 privates (sepoys), 120 non-commissioned officers (havildars and naiks), 20 native commissioned officers (subedars and jemadars), 2 British sergeants and 26 British commissioned officers.
Regiments were commanded by a lieutenant-colonel and were divided into 10 companies, each assigned 2 British officers and 2 native officers. Each regiment was assigned an adjutant, an interpreter and a quartermaster.
The majority of recruits for the Bengal Native Infantry in the years leading up to the Mutiny were from the districts of Bengal, Oudh (Awadh) and the surrounding areas – around three quarters of the total numbers.

Mutinying regiments officially ceased to exist following the Mutiny and in 1861 the twelve surviving Bengal Native Infantry regiments (units that did not mutiny, units that were disarmed and later considered to be free of mutineers or units that were disbanded peacefully & were later reformed) were joined by a mix of hastily raised units (for example, the Allahabad Levy became the 33rd Bengal Native Infantry) or newly created units from the Punjab (for example, the 7th Regiment of Punjab Infantry became the 19th Bengal Native Infantry). In addition, soldiers who did not mutiny when the rest of their regiment did so joined units such as The Lucknow Regiment or The Loyal Purbiah Regiment.

Pre-1857 list of Bengal Native Infantry Regiments

The Mutiny and its aftermath

During the Indian Mutiny all but twelve of the seventy-four regular Bengal Native Infantry regiments either mutinied, were disarmed, or disbanded peacefully and returned to their homes. Those that mutinied engaged in armed conflict with their officers, other East India Company forces or British Army units. The men of the Bengal Native Infantry were professional soldiers and "Mutiny" was a specific criminal offence under the Articles of War and the Mutiny Acts, carrying the death penalty following a conviction after trial by court-martial. The executions were carried out either by hanging, by firing squad or by blowing from a gun. Mutinying regiments officially ceased to exist and their place in the Order of precedence of the Bengal Army was taken by another unit.

Those BNI units that were disbanded without violence, were disarmed either by their officers, other East India Company forces or by British Army units using threat of force and then either remained under discipline but weaponless in their cantonments or were allowed to disperse. For example, the 33rd and 35th regiments of Bengal Native Infantry were disarmed at Phillour on the morning of 25 June 1857 by the 52nd (Oxfordshire) Regiment of Foot (around 800 men) under the command of Brigadier General John Nicholson with the support of the 17th Light Field Battery, Bengal Horse Artillery (12 guns). The 33rd and 35th BNI, around 1500 men, were part of the Punjab Moveable Column, a brigade that was formed to quash outbreaks of mutiny in the Punjab and that was eventually ordered to Delhi to join the Delhi Field Force. Brigadier General Nicholson was doubtful of their loyalty and was therefore unwilling to take these regiments to Delhi. As the Moveable Column made its way to Phillour the 52nd Regiment of Foot and the artillery were ordered to press on ahead, arriving at the camping ground before the other regiments. When the 35th BNI arrived at the camping ground they found themselves surrounded on three sides by the 52nd Regiment of Foot and covered by the guns of the artillery. Brigadier General Nicholson then informed Colonel Younghusband, the commanding officer, that his men "must give up their arms!" – this order was complied with peacefully. The scene was repeated a short time later when the 33rd BNI arrived at the camping ground.

Sepoys from those regiments that were disbanded peacefully, generally returned to their homes, including the 34th Regiment of Bengal Native Infantry which was disbanded on 6 May 1857 at Barrackpore following the actions of Mangal Pandey and his execution for mutiny shortly before the main outbreak. Two regiments of BNI (the 65th and 70th) were serving in China at the time of the outbreak and remained unaffected by the disturbances in Bengal.

During the Mutiny the United Kingdom Government passed the Government of India Act 1858 which established the British Raj, bringing to an end Company rule in India by stripping the East India Company of all its administrative powers and handing over control of its Indian territories and armed forces to the British Crown. Section 56 of the Government of India Act stated:

"LVI. The military and naval forces of the East India Company shall be deemed to be the Indian military and naval forces of Her Majesty, and shall be under the same obligations to serve Her Majesty as they would have been under to serve the said Company, and shall be liable to serve within the same territorial limits only, for the same terms only, and be entitled to the like pay, pensions, allowances, and privileges, and the like advantages as
regards promotion and otherwise, as if they had continued in the service of the said Company: such forces, and all persons hereafter enlisting in or entering the same, shall continue and be subject to all Acts of Parliament, laws of the Governor-General of India in Council, and articles of war, and all other laws, regulations, and provisions relating to the East India Company's military and naval forces respectively, as if Her Majesty's
Indian military and naval forces respectively had throughout such acts, laws, articles, regulations; and provisions been mentioned or referred to, instead of such forces of the said Company; and the pay and expenses of and incident to Her Majesty's Indian military and naval forces shall be defrayed out of the revenues of India."

The twelve "old regiments" that did not mutiny, continued to serve after the Mutiny and were allowed to retain traditions such as red uniforms. and existing battle honours. Following the completion of a widespread reform of the army in what was now the British Raj, the Bengal Native Infantry was reduced in size and renumbered in 1861. The "loyal" regiments took the first places in the order of precedence, starting with the 21st Regiment of BNI becoming the 1st BNI. There was then a second renumbering of the regiments the same year as a result of transferring four regiments to the Goorkha list. The post-1861 Bengal Native Infantry therefore consisted of 45 regiments.

Post-1861 list of Bengal Native Infantry Regiments

Operational history and legacy

Operational history

The Bengal Native Infantry has participated in major battles and wars that include, among others, the following engagements:
 Battle of Plassey
 Third Carnatic War
 First Anglo-Mysore War
 Second Anglo-Mysore War
 Third Anglo-Mysore War
 First Anglo-Maratha War
 Cotiote War
 Fourth Anglo-Mysore War
 Second Anglo-Maratha War
 Invasion of Java
 Anglo-Nepalese War
 Third Anglo-Maratha War
 First Anglo-Burmese War
 First Opium War
 First Anglo-Afghan War
 First Anglo-Sikh War
 Second Anglo-Sikh War
 Second Anglo-Burmese War
 Indian Mutiny
 Second Opium War
 Second Anglo-Afghan War
 Suakin Expedition
 Third Anglo-Burmese War

Legacy

The Bengal Army was absorbed into the British Indian Army in 1903 with a large number of infantry units passing into the newly organised force. As shown by the following examples, there are a number of military units active today that can trace their lineage directly to regiments of Bengal Native Infantry in the armies of India, Pakistan and the United Kingdom. In many cases these units maintain the traditions and retain the battle honours of their antecedent regiments.

India
 The Jat Regiment traces its lineage back to 1795, to an East India Company unit known as the Calcutta Native Militia which, after a series of name changes, became the 18th regiment of Bengal Native Infantry in 1861. The Jat Regiment also traces its lineage to the pre-1857 43rd and 65th regiments of Bengal Native Infantry. The regiment retains the battle honours of its antecedent units.
 The Sikh Regiment traces its lineage back to the post-1861 14th, 15th and 45th regiments of Bengal Native Infantry (among other units). The regiment retains the battle honours and some traditions of its antecedent units.

Pakistan
 6th Battalion, The Punjab Regiment directly traces its lineage to the post-1861 20th regiment of Bengal Native Infantry. The Punjab Regiment does not retain any battle honours gained before Pakistan's independence.

United Kingdom
 The Royal Gurkha Rifles traces its lineage to the post-1861 42nd and 43rd regiments of Bengal Native Infantry (among other units). The Royal Gurkha Rifles retains the battle honours and traditions of its antecedent units.

See also
 List of Victoria Cross recipients of the Indian Army
 Barrackpore Mutiny of 1824

References
Citations

 
1757 establishments in British India
Honourable East India Company regiments
British Indian Army infantry regiments
Military history of India
Military history of the British East India Company